A tariff or customs duty is a tax on imported or exported goods.

A tariff may also refer to:
 Tariff, a schedule of prices for the sale or rental of a product or service
 Tariff (regulation) a contract between a regulatory agency and a business, such as a utility company, which sets rates and conditions for the regulated service
 Tariff (criminal law), in British criminal law, a minimum prison sentence
 Tariff, Ohio, United States
 Degree of difficulty, in some sports